Kari Lehtonen (born November 16, 1983) is a Finnish former professional ice hockey goaltender who played 14 seasons in the National Hockey League (NHL) for the Atlanta Thrashers and Dallas Stars. He was selected second overall in the 2002 NHL Entry Draft by the Thrashers, becoming the highest-drafted European goaltender, as well as being tied with Patrik Laine, Alexander Barkov and Kaapo Kakko for the highest-drafted Finnish player in NHL history.

Playing career

Early years

Lehtonen was drafted second overall in the 2002 NHL Entry Draft by the Atlanta Thrashers after an outstanding 2001–02 season in the Finnish SM-liiga. Lehtonen was the backup goalie for Jokerit, but captured the starting position and won the Urpo Ylönen trophy, given to the best goalie of the season, and the league's playoff MVP award, the Jari Kurri trophy. Lehtonen stayed with Jokerit for one more season before moving to North America.

Atlanta Thrashers
During the 2003–04 season, Lehtonen mostly spent his time with the Chicago Wolves, the Thrashers' American Hockey League (AHL) affiliate, but he was called up for a number of occasions and played four games for the Thrashers, winning all four of them and posting one shutout. In the four games with the Thrashers, he posted a .953 save percentage and 1.25 goals against average (GAA).

Lehtonen spent the 2004–05 NHL lockout season with the Wolves, adjusting to the North American playing style. After playing 57 games for the Wolves, of which he won 38, posting .929 save percentage and 2.27 GAA, the Thrashers called him up, and Lehtonen started the 2005–06 season as the starting goalie for Atlanta. On the opening night of the 2005–06 season, Lehtonen suffered a serious groin injury when Florida Panthers centre Nathan Horton collided with him. The injury sidelined him for 35 games. Lehtonen was once again injured on April 6, 2006, when Tampa Bay Lightning forward Chris Dingman collided with him; Lehtonen tried to get to his feet, but sprained his ankle in the process.

Shortly into the 2006–07 season, Lehtonen broke the Atlanta Thrashers shutout streak record previously held by Michael Garnett. He also set his career highs in every category. AirTran Airways, a low-cost airline, signed Lehtonen as an endorser for the 2006–07 season. On February 8, 2007, Lehtonen became the Thrashers franchise leader for wins by a goaltender with 49, surpassing Pasi Nurminen's record of 48. On April 12, 2007, Lehtonen was the starting goaltender for the Thrashers in their first Stanley Cup playoff game.

After a rough start to the 2007–08 season, Lehtonen suffered another groin injury on October 18, 2007. He would miss 16 games before returning on December 5, 2007. He finished the season with a respectable save percentage to go along with four shutouts as the Thrashers failed to qualify for the 2008 playoffs.

Dallas Stars
On February 9, 2010, Lehtonen was traded to the Dallas Stars in exchange for Ivan Vishnevskiy and a fourth-round draft pick in the 2010 NHL Entry Draft (Ivan Telegin). Prior to the start of the 2010–11 season, the Stars signed Lehtonen to a three-year, $10.65 million extension. In his first full season in Dallas, Lehtonen compiled a 34–24 record with a 2.55 GAA. Lehtonen and the Stars were officially eliminated from contention for a seed in the 2011 playoffs after losing to the Minnesota Wild on the final day of the regular season.

On September 4, 2012, the day before an impending lockout, Lehtonen signed a five-year, $29.5 million contract. Lehtonen made the playoffs with the Stars for the first time in 2014. Prior to the 2015–16 season, the Stars acquired fellow Finnish goaltender Antti Niemi to compete with Lehtonen. They alternated regularly the next two seasons. In the 2016 playoffs, Lehtonen established himself as the primary goalie. However, in Game 7 of the second round, he was pulled after giving up three goals in the first period as the Stars' season ended with a 6–1 loss to the St. Louis Blues.

He earned his 300th win on December 13, 2017, in a game against the New York Islanders by making 32 saves to clinch a 5–2 win.

International play 
Lehtonen has been selected to play for Finland's youth and national teams on many occasions. He won a bronze medal at the 2014 Winter Olympics. He played in two games, one victory in the preliminary round and a loss in the semi-finals.

Career statistics

Regular season and playoffs

International

Awards and honours

 Urpo Ylönen trophy for best SM-liiga goaltender — 2002 and 2003
 Jari Kurri trophy for best player during the playoffs — 2002
 SM-liiga champion 2002
 2004 World Cup of Hockey (runner-up)
 Silver Medal in the 2007 IIHF World Championship
 Best Goaltender in the 2007 IIHF World Championship
 Bronze Medal in the 2014 Winter Olympics

Records
 Atlanta Thrashers franchise leader for games played by a goaltender (204).
 Atlanta Thrashers franchise leader for victories (94).
 Atlanta Thrashers franchise leader shutouts (14).
 Atlanta Thrashers franchise leader for games played by a goaltender in a single season (68).
 Atlanta Thrashers franchise leader for saves in a single season (1,892).
 Atlanta Thrashers franchise leader for shutouts in a single season (4).
 Atlanta Thrashers franchise leader for starts in a single season (66).
 Atlanta Thrashers franchise leader for minutes played in a single season (3,934).

Mask history
 While playing for the AHL's Chicago Wolves, the Hamburglar was featured on Lehtonen's mask, an homage to the nickname he received shortly after arriving from Finland and becoming enamoured with McDonald's hamburgers.
 He had a depiction of rapper Lil Jon, who is an avid Thrashers fan, on his mask.
 In the past, Lehtonen has worn helmets featuring characters Yuna and Rikku from the video game Final Fantasy X-2, as well as Uma Thurman and Lucy Liu's characters from Kill Bill. Lehtonen, however, is not a video game fanatic; "I've never played it, but I saw a couple of commercials about the game and just thought it looked awesome."
 He also had a mask made featuring Optimus Prime from Transformers, which was never worn in a game, only in pre-game warm ups.
 He also wore a mask that showed a depiction of Heath Ledger's Joker character from The Dark Knight, with a stylized ATL featured on the other side.
 His first mask for the Dallas Stars depicted Clint Eastwood's character from the movie The Good, The Bad, and The Ugly.
 His second mask for the Stars featured Chuck Norris.
 His former mask for Dallas Stars featured characters and scenes from the movie Tombstone.

Personal life
On July 2, 2011, Kari married longtime girlfriend Abbe Schutter in a private ceremony at the Club at Hammock Beach in Palm Coast, Florida. Kari met Abbe while playing in Atlanta.

Lehtonen's childhood idol was iconic Finnish goaltender Jarmo Myllys.

References

External links
 

1983 births
Living people
Atlanta Thrashers draft picks
Atlanta Thrashers players
Chicago Wolves players
Dallas Stars players
Finnish ice hockey goaltenders
Ice hockey players at the 2014 Winter Olympics
Jokerit players
Medalists at the 2014 Winter Olympics
National Hockey League first-round draft picks
Olympic bronze medalists for Finland
Olympic ice hockey players of Finland
Olympic medalists in ice hockey
Ice hockey people from Helsinki